The Damned is the ninth album by New Zealand noise rock band The Dead C, released on 11 November 2003 through Starlight Furniture Co..

Track listing

Personnel 
The Dead C – production
Michael Morley – instruments
Bruce Russell – instruments
Robbie Yeats – instruments
Nathan Thompson – instruments
James Kirk – instruments

References

2003 albums
The Dead C albums